Benita Plezere-Eglīte (née Benita Plezere; born on 12 October 1937 in Riga, Latvia) is a Latvian repressed person known for the drawings she made when she was deported to Siberia.

Biography
Benita's father was a farmer from the village of Annenieki in Dobele Municipality, where the family owned a  farm called "Tērces". Benita was raised on this farm with her older brother and sister. Her mother was a school teacher from Jelgava. The family lived in Siberia for seven years before they were finally given permission to leave in October 1956. The family returned to Latvia in 1956 where they found their farm had been destroyed; all the wood from the house had been removed and used as firewood, leaving only the foundations, and all the farmland had been made part of the local kolkhoz.

Drawings
Benita Plezere is known for the drawings she made whilst living as a deportee in Siberia, which she then sent to her godmother back home in Latvia. The drawings depict her family's arrest, the journey to Siberia and their everyday lives in Omsk. Once the family returned, in 1956, Benita's mother hid the drawings as she was afraid of what could happen if they were found by the Soviet authorities. However, in 1989, the pictures were taken out from their hiding place when the family thought it was safer because Latvia was in breaking away from the Soviet Union. Once the independence of Latvia was restored the drawings were donated to the Museum of the Occupation of Latvia and in 1996 a selection of the drawings were published in the book "Through the Eyes of a Child". In 2016 a temporary exhibition of the same name was also displayed in the museum, and a short sand cinema film was made based on the life of Benita Plezere.

References 

1937 births
Living people
Artists from Riga